Sebergham is a small village and civil parish in the English county of Cumbria.  It is located on the B5305, south of Carlisle and south-east of Wigton. The civil parish population at the 2011 Census was 365.

St Mary's Church is medieval in origin, repaired in the 18th century and with a tower added in the 1820s.  It is a Grade II* listed building and lies on the Cumbria Way walk. The parish formed part of Inglewood Forest. Sebergham Bridge dates from 1689 and Bell Bridge dated from 1772: both were Grade II listed. Bell Bridge collapsed and was swept away by the River Caldew during the passing of the remnants of Storm Jonas on 27 January 2016.  It had previously been damaged by Storm Desmond in December 2015. The replacement Bell Bridge, incorporating stone from its Georgian predecessor, was opened to the public on 19 December 2017.

Sebergham Castle is a farmhouse, formerly known as Colerigg Hall, transformed in the Gothic Revival style in the late eighteenth century.  A mile to the south-west of the village is Warnell Hall, a fortified house which is now a farmhouse. It was built in the 16th century incorporating part of a 14th-century pele tower.

Governance
Sebergham is in the parliamentary constituency of Penrith and the Border. Neil Hudson was elected its Conservative Member of Parliament at the 2019 General Election, replacing Rory Stewart.

For the European Parliament its residents voted to elect MEP's for the North West England constituency.

See also

Listed buildings in Sebergham

References

External links
 Cumbria County History Trust: Sebergham (nb: provisional research only – see Talk page)

Villages in Cumbria
Allerdale
Inglewood Forest